The "Acidobacteriia" is a class of Acidobacteriota.

Phylogeny
The currently accepted taxonomy is based on the List of Prokaryotic names with Standing in Nomenclature and National Center for Biotechnology Information. Numbered orders do not yet have any cultured representatives.

See also
 List of bacterial orders
 List of bacteria genera

References

Bacteria classes
Acidobacteriota